The 1929 VFL season was the 33rd season of the Victorian Football League (VFL), the highest level senior Australian rules football competition in Victoria. The season featured twelve clubs, ran from 27 April until 28 September, and comprised an 18-game home-and-away season followed by a finals series featuring the top four clubs.

The premiership was won by the Collingwood Football Club for the eighth time and third time consecutively. Collingwood became the first and only club to record an undefeated home-and-away season in the league's history, with an 18–0 record; and although it lost its semi-final, it won the premiership by defeating  by 29 points in the 1929 VFL Grand Final.

Premiership season
In 1929, the VFL competition consisted of twelve teams of 18 on-the-field players each, with no "reserves", although any of the 18 players who had left the playing field for any reason could later resume their place on the field at any time during the match.

Teams played each other in a home-and-away season of 18 rounds; matches 12 to 18 were the "home-and-away reverse" of matches 1 to 7.

Once the 18 round home-and-away season had finished, the 1929 VFL Premiers were determined by the specific format and conventions of the amended "Argus system".

Round 1

|- bgcolor="#CCCCFF"
| Home team
| Home team score
| Away team
| Away team score
| Venue
| Crowd
| Date
|- bgcolor="#FFFFFF"
| 
| 12.8 (80)
| 
| 7.16 (58)
| MCG
| 16,843
| 27 April 1929
|- bgcolor="#FFFFFF"
| 
| 15.2 (92)
| 
| 11.9 (75)
| Victoria Park
| 25,000
| 27 April 1929
|- bgcolor="#FFFFFF"
| 
| 19.17 (131)
| 
| 8.10 (58)
| Princes Park
| 7,000
| 27 April 1929
|- bgcolor="#FFFFFF"
| 
| 12.10 (82)
| 
| 8.10 (58)
| Junction Oval
| 13,000
| 27 April 1929
|- bgcolor="#FFFFFF"
| 
| 8.6 (54)
| 
| 12.20 (92)
| Arden Street Oval
| 7,000
| 27 April 1929
|- bgcolor="#FFFFFF"
| 
| 10.18 (78)
| 
| 10.9 (69)
| Western Oval
| 17,000
| 27 April 1929

Round 2

|- bgcolor="#CCCCFF"
| Home team
| Home team score
| Away team
| Away team score
| Venue
| Crowd
| Date
|- bgcolor="#FFFFFF"
| 
| 12.15 (87)
| 
| 3.10 (28)
| Corio Oval
| 11,000
| 4 May 1929
|- bgcolor="#FFFFFF"
| 
| 14.23 (107)
| 
| 8.7 (55)
| Brunswick Street Oval
| 13,000
| 4 May 1929
|- bgcolor="#FFFFFF"
| 
| 17.10 (112)
| 
| 16.8 (104)
| Windy Hill
| 20,000
| 4 May 1929
|- bgcolor="#FFFFFF"
| 
| 12.17 (89)
| 
| 9.9 (63)
| Lake Oval
| 21,270
| 4 May 1929
|- bgcolor="#FFFFFF"
| 
| 11.7 (73)
| 
| 18.18 (126)
| Glenferrie Oval
| 12,000
| 4 May 1929
|- bgcolor="#FFFFFF"
| 
| 16.23 (119)
| 
| 16.13 (109)
| Punt Road Oval
| 36,000
| 4 May 1929

Round 3

|- bgcolor="#CCCCFF"
| Home team
| Home team score
| Away team
| Away team score
| Venue
| Crowd
| Date
|- bgcolor="#FFFFFF"
| 
| 8.16 (64)
| 
| 7.11 (53)
| Western Oval
| 15,000
| 11 May 1929
|- bgcolor="#FFFFFF"
| 
| 9.9 (63)
| 
| 15.17 (107)
| Windy Hill
| 25,000
| 11 May 1929
|- bgcolor="#FFFFFF"
| 
| 19.20 (134)
| 
| 4.14 (38)
| Victoria Park
| 18,000
| 11 May 1929
|- bgcolor="#FFFFFF"
| 
| 13.28 (106)
| 
| 9.14 (68)
| Princes Park
| 17,000
| 11 May 1929
|- bgcolor="#FFFFFF"
| 
| 8.9 (57)
| 
| 8.12 (60)
| Junction Oval
| 21,000
| 11 May 1929
|- bgcolor="#FFFFFF"
| 
| 15.17 (107)
| 
| 12.4 (76)
| MCG
| 18,920
| 11 May 1929

Round 4

|- bgcolor="#CCCCFF"
| Home team
| Home team score
| Away team
| Away team score
| Venue
| Crowd
| Date
|- bgcolor="#FFFFFF"
| 
| 12.8 (80)
| 
| 16.21 (117)
| Brunswick Street Oval
| 14,000
| 18 May 1929
|- bgcolor="#FFFFFF"
| 
| 6.5 (41)
| 
| 14.15 (99)
| Arden Street Oval
| 9,000
| 18 May 1929
|- bgcolor="#FFFFFF"
| 
| 14.19 (103)
| 
| 11.19 (85)
| Punt Road Oval
| 22,000
| 18 May 1929
|- bgcolor="#FFFFFF"
| 
| 10.10 (70)
| 
| 10.15 (75)
| Glenferrie Oval
| 12,000
| 18 May 1929
|- bgcolor="#FFFFFF"
| 
| 6.13 (49)
| 
| 12.13 (85)
| Corio Oval
| 20,499
| 18 May 1929
|- bgcolor="#FFFFFF"
| 
| 9.19 (73)
| 
| 10.19 (79)
| Lake Oval
| 25,000
| 18 May 1929

Round 5

|- bgcolor="#CCCCFF"
| Home team
| Home team score
| Away team
| Away team score
| Venue
| Crowd
| Date
|- bgcolor="#FFFFFF"
| 
| 10.15 (75)
| 
| 11.9 (75)
| Western Oval
| 15,500
| 25 May 1929
|- bgcolor="#FFFFFF"
| 
| 10.18 (78)
| 
| 7.10 (52)
| Windy Hill
| 15,000
| 25 May 1929
|- bgcolor="#FFFFFF"
| 
| 16.19 (115)
| 
| 8.11 (59)
| Victoria Park
| 18,000
| 25 May 1929
|- bgcolor="#FFFFFF"
| 
| 10.13 (73)
| 
| 8.7 (55)
| Princes Park
| 30,000
| 25 May 1929
|- bgcolor="#FFFFFF"
| 
| 18.13 (121)
| 
| 7.13 (55)
| Junction Oval
| 15,000
| 25 May 1929
|- bgcolor="#FFFFFF"
| 
| 16.22 (118)
| 
| 12.5 (77)
| Punt Road Oval
| 14,000
| 25 May 1929

Round 6

|- bgcolor="#CCCCFF"
| Home team
| Home team score
| Away team
| Away team score
| Venue
| Crowd
| Date
|- bgcolor="#FFFFFF"
| 
| 11.14 (80)
| 
| 10.17 (77)
| Lake Oval
| 24,000
| 1 June 1929
|- bgcolor="#FFFFFF"
| 
| 11.15 (81)
| 
| 20.12 (132)
| Arden Street Oval
| 10,000
| 1 June 1929
|- bgcolor="#FFFFFF"
| 
| 10.13 (73)
| 
| 20.12 (132)
| Brunswick Street Oval
| 25,000
| 1 June 1929
|- bgcolor="#FFFFFF"
| 
| 8.13 (61)
| 
| 8.11 (59)
| MCG
| 38,104
| 3 June 1929
|- bgcolor="#FFFFFF"
| 
| 16.24 (120)
| 
| 7.15 (57)
| Western Oval
| 14,000
| 3 June 1929
|- bgcolor="#FFFFFF"
| 
| 7.13 (55)
| 
| 8.12 (60)
| Corio Oval
| 13,250
| 3 June 1929

Round 7

|- bgcolor="#CCCCFF"
| Home team
| Home team score
| Away team
| Away team score
| Venue
| Crowd
| Date
|- bgcolor="#FFFFFF"
| 
| 15.8 (98)
| 
| 11.13 (79)
| Glenferrie Oval
| 10,000
| 15 June 1929
|- bgcolor="#FFFFFF"
| 
| 18.25 (133)
| 
| 12.8 (80)
| Windy Hill
| 15,000
| 15 June 1929
|- bgcolor="#FFFFFF"
| 
| 12.11 (83)
| 
| 9.5 (59)
| Victoria Park
| 22,000
| 15 June 1929
|- bgcolor="#FFFFFF"
| 
| 15.17 (107)
| 
| 7.10 (52)
| Princes Park
| 18,000
| 15 June 1929
|- bgcolor="#FFFFFF"
| 
| 13.15 (93)
| 
| 12.13 (85)
| Punt Road Oval
| 19,000
| 15 June 1929
|- bgcolor="#FFFFFF"
| 
| 13.14 (92)
| 
| 8.13 (61)
| Junction Oval
| 20,000
| 15 June 1929

Round 8

|- bgcolor="#CCCCFF"
| Home team
| Home team score
| Away team
| Away team score
| Venue
| Crowd
| Date
|- bgcolor="#FFFFFF"
| 
| 8.8 (56)
| 
| 2.13 (25)
| Corio Oval
| 4,000
| 22 June 1929
|- bgcolor="#FFFFFF"
| 
| 11.9 (75)
| 
| 8.13 (61)
| Western Oval
| 11,000
| 22 June 1929
|- bgcolor="#FFFFFF"
| 
| 13.8 (86)
| 
| 19.13 (127)
| Brunswick Street Oval
| 14,000
| 22 June 1929
|- bgcolor="#FFFFFF"
| 
| 4.14 (38)
| 
| 10.12 (72)
| Arden Street Oval
| 9,000
| 22 June 1929
|- bgcolor="#FFFFFF"
| 
| 7.8 (50)
| 
| 7.12 (54)
| Junction Oval
| 27,000
| 22 June 1929
|- bgcolor="#FFFFFF"
| 
| 5.12 (42)
| 
| 10.17 (77)
| MCG
| 26,591
| 22 June 1929

Round 9

|- bgcolor="#CCCCFF"
| Home team
| Home team score
| Away team
| Away team score
| Venue
| Crowd
| Date
|- bgcolor="#FFFFFF"
| 
| 11.10 (76)
| 
| 12.10 (82)
| Windy Hill
| 15,000
| 29 June 1929
|- bgcolor="#FFFFFF"
| 
| 20.19 (139)
| 
| 14.10 (94)
| Victoria Park
| 18,000
| 29 June 1929
|- bgcolor="#FFFFFF"
| 
| 12.22 (94)
| 
| 7.15 (57)
| Princes Park
| 32,000
| 29 June 1929
|- bgcolor="#FFFFFF"
| 
| 19.15 (129)
| 
| 11.10 (76)
| Punt Road Oval
| 11,000
| 29 June 1929
|- bgcolor="#FFFFFF"
| 
| 10.13 (73)
| 
| 10.15 (75)
| Lake Oval
| 12,000
| 29 June 1929
|- bgcolor="#FFFFFF"
| 
| 13.15 (93)
| 
| 8.10 (58)
| Glenferrie Oval
| 10,000
| 29 June 1929

Round 10

|- bgcolor="#CCCCFF"
| Home team
| Home team score
| Away team
| Away team score
| Venue
| Crowd
| Date
|- bgcolor="#FFFFFF"
| 
| 10.8 (68)
| 
| 9.11 (65)
| MCG
| 18,048
| 6 July 1929
|- bgcolor="#FFFFFF"
| 
| 9.13 (67)
| 
| 9.5 (59)
| Western Oval
| 9,000
| 6 July 1929
|- bgcolor="#FFFFFF"
| 
| 12.14 (86)
| 
| 17.8 (110)
| Brunswick Street Oval
| 6,000
| 6 July 1929
|- bgcolor="#FFFFFF"
| 
| 8.6 (54)
| 
| 8.18 (66)
| Arden Street Oval
| 4,500
| 6 July 1929
|- bgcolor="#FFFFFF"
| 
| 9.9 (63)
| 
| 7.6 (48)
| Junction Oval
| 12,500
| 6 July 1929
|- bgcolor="#FFFFFF"
| 
| 15.15 (105)
| 
| 11.10 (76)
| Victoria Park
| 33,000
| 6 July 1929

Round 11

|- bgcolor="#CCCCFF"
| Home team
| Home team score
| Away team
| Away team score
| Venue
| Crowd
| Date
|- bgcolor="#FFFFFF"
| 
| 13.13 (91)
| 
| 7.11 (53)
| Punt Road Oval
| 20,000
| 13 July 1929
|- bgcolor="#FFFFFF"
| 
| 5.13 (43)
| 
| 7.11 (53)
| Glenferrie Oval
| 8,000
| 13 July 1929
|- bgcolor="#FFFFFF"
| 
| 15.20 (110)
| 
| 6.7 (43)
| Princes Park
| 20,000
| 13 July 1929
|- bgcolor="#FFFFFF"
| 
| 17.14 (116)
| 
| 12.9 (81)
| Lake Oval
| 8,000
| 13 July 1929
|- bgcolor="#FFFFFF"
| 
| 15.6 (96)
| 
| 10.11 (71)
| Corio Oval
| 7,500
| 13 July 1929
|- bgcolor="#FFFFFF"
| 
| 11.7 (73)
| 
| 13.14 (92)
| Windy Hill
| 17,000
| 13 July 1929

Round 12

|- bgcolor="#CCCCFF"
| Home team
| Home team score
| Away team
| Away team score
| Venue
| Crowd
| Date
|- bgcolor="#FFFFFF"
| 
| 7.9 (51)
| 
| 15.12 (102)
| Glenferrie Oval
| 12,000
| 20 July 1929
|- bgcolor="#FFFFFF"
| 
| 11.14 (80)
| 
| 8.6 (54)
| Corio Oval
| 7,000
| 20 July 1929
|- bgcolor="#FFFFFF"
| 
| 9.15 (69)
| 
| 12.16 (88)
| Brunswick Street Oval
| 10,000
| 20 July 1929
|- bgcolor="#FFFFFF"
| 
| 12.10 (82)
| 
| 9.15 (69)
| Lake Oval
| 15,000
| 20 July 1929
|- bgcolor="#FFFFFF"
| 
| 11.9 (75)
| 
| 16.21 (117)
| Punt Road Oval
| 33,000
| 20 July 1929
|- bgcolor="#FFFFFF"
| 
| 8.7 (55)
| 
| 7.17 (59)
| Windy Hill
| 22,000
| 20 July 1929

Round 13

|- bgcolor="#CCCCFF"
| Home team
| Home team score
| Away team
| Away team score
| Venue
| Crowd
| Date
|- bgcolor="#FFFFFF"
| 
| 15.9 (99)
| 
| 8.8 (56)
| Junction Oval
| 18,500
| 27 July 1929
|- bgcolor="#FFFFFF"
| 
| 22.10 (142)
| 
| 7.14 (56)
| Victoria Park
| 7,000
| 27 July 1929
|- bgcolor="#FFFFFF"
| 
| 8.9 (57)
| 
| 13.15 (93)
| Princes Park
| 27,000
| 27 July 1929
|- bgcolor="#FFFFFF"
| 
| 6.14 (50)
| 
| 6.12 (48)
| MCG
| 12,834
| 27 July 1929
|- bgcolor="#FFFFFF"
| 
| 12.13 (85)
| 
| 15.12 (102)
| Arden Street Oval
| 5,000
| 27 July 1929
|- bgcolor="#FFFFFF"
| 
| 11.11 (77)
| 
| 10.18 (78)
| Western Oval
| 14,000
| 27 July 1929

Round 14

|- bgcolor="#CCCCFF"
| Home team
| Home team score
| Away team
| Away team score
| Venue
| Crowd
| Date
|- bgcolor="#FFFFFF"
| 
| 9.6 (60)
| 
| 11.5 (71)
| Corio Oval
| 10,500
| 3 August 1929
|- bgcolor="#FFFFFF"
| 
| 5.11 (41)
| 
| 11.11 (77)
| Brunswick Street Oval
| 8,000
| 3 August 1929
|- bgcolor="#FFFFFF"
| 
| 9.8 (62)
| 
| 7.7 (49)
| Arden Street Oval
| 7,000
| 3 August 1929
|- bgcolor="#FFFFFF"
| 
| 10.14 (74)
| 
| 10.14 (74)
| Punt Road Oval
| 22,000
| 3 August 1929
|- bgcolor="#FFFFFF"
| 
| 6.7 (43)
| 
| 10.10 (70)
| Lake Oval
| 20,000
| 3 August 1929
|- bgcolor="#FFFFFF"
| 
| 5.7 (37)
| 
| 7.8 (50)
| Glenferrie Oval
| 6,000
| 3 August 1929

Round 15

|- bgcolor="#CCCCFF"
| Home team
| Home team score
| Away team
| Away team score
| Venue
| Crowd
| Date
|- bgcolor="#FFFFFF"
| 
| 15.17 (107)
| 
| 6.14 (50)
| MCG
| 8,421
| 10 August 1929
|- bgcolor="#FFFFFF"
| 
| 11.6 (72)
| 
| 14.15 (99)
| Western Oval
| 13,000
| 10 August 1929
|- bgcolor="#FFFFFF"
| 
| 15.10 (100)
| 
| 13.14 (92)
| Windy Hill
| 11,000
| 10 August 1929
|- bgcolor="#FFFFFF"
| 
| 13.9 (87)
| 
| 8.12 (60)
| Victoria Park
| 14,000
| 10 August 1929
|- bgcolor="#FFFFFF"
| 
| 17.17 (119)
| 
| 11.15 (81)
| Princes Park
| 20,000
| 10 August 1929
|- bgcolor="#FFFFFF"
| 
| 21.16 (142)
| 
| 10.15 (75)
| Junction Oval
| 14,500
| 10 August 1929

Round 16

|- bgcolor="#CCCCFF"
| Home team
| Home team score
| Away team
| Away team score
| Venue
| Crowd
| Date
|- bgcolor="#FFFFFF"
| 
| 9.8 (62)
| 
| 20.12 (132)
| Arden Street Oval
| 9,000
| 17 August 1929
|- bgcolor="#FFFFFF"
| 
| 8.10 (58)
| 
| 11.14 (80)
| Glenferrie Oval
| 12,500
| 17 August 1929
|- bgcolor="#FFFFFF"
| 
| 11.16 (82)
| 
| 6.5 (41)
| MCG
| 13,891
| 17 August 1929
|- bgcolor="#FFFFFF"
| 
| 14.10 (94)
| 
| 13.10 (88)
| Lake Oval
| 15,000
| 17 August 1929
|- bgcolor="#FFFFFF"
| 
| 8.7 (55)
| 
| 16.15 (111)
| Brunswick Street Oval
| 13,000
| 17 August 1929
|- bgcolor="#FFFFFF"
| 
| 2.13 (25)
| 
| 5.9 (39)
| Corio Oval
| 10,000
| 17 August 1929

Round 17

|- bgcolor="#CCCCFF"
| Home team
| Home team score
| Away team
| Away team score
| Venue
| Crowd
| Date
|- bgcolor="#FFFFFF"
| 
| 18.28 (136)
| 
| 10.5 (65)
| Punt Road Oval
| 12,000
| 24 August 1929
|- bgcolor="#FFFFFF"
| 
| 7.11 (53)
| 
| 6.15 (51)
| Windy Hill
| 9,000
| 24 August 1929
|- bgcolor="#FFFFFF"
| 
| 21.12 (138)
| 
| 8.13 (61)
| Victoria Park
| 6,000
| 24 August 1929
|- bgcolor="#FFFFFF"
| 
| 15.18 (108)
| 
| 9.15 (69)
| Princes Park
| 13,000
| 24 August 1929
|- bgcolor="#FFFFFF"
| 
| 9.12 (66)
| 
| 6.13 (49)
| Junction Oval
| 35,000
| 24 August 1929
|- bgcolor="#FFFFFF"
| 
| 10.17 (77)
| 
| 5.3 (33)
| Glenferrie Oval
| 4,000
| 24 August 1929

Round 18

|- bgcolor="#CCCCFF"
| Home team
| Home team score
| Away team
| Away team score
| Venue
| Crowd
| Date
|- bgcolor="#FFFFFF"
| 
| 12.10 (82)
| 
| 5.12 (42)
| Corio Oval
| 6,500
| 31 August 1929
|- bgcolor="#FFFFFF"
| 
| 4.18 (42)
| 
| 9.13 (67)
| Western Oval
| 10,000
| 31 August 1929
|- bgcolor="#FFFFFF"
| 
| 13.10 (88)
| 
| 11.5 (71)
| Lake Oval
| 8,000
| 31 August 1929
|- bgcolor="#FFFFFF"
| 
| 11.18 (84)
| 
| 7.11 (53)
| Brunswick Street Oval
| 8,500
| 31 August 1929
|- bgcolor="#FFFFFF"
| 
| 5.10 (40)
| 
| 14.12 (96)
| MCG
| 41,316
| 31 August 1929
|- bgcolor="#FFFFFF"
| 
| 8.8 (56)
| 
| 8.15 (63)
| Arden Street Oval
| 8,000
| 31 August 1929

Ladder

Finals
All of the 1929 finals were played at the MCG so the home team in the semi-finals and Preliminary Final is purely the higher ranked team from the ladder but in the Grand Final the home team was the team that won the Preliminary Final.

Semi finals

|- bgcolor="#CCCCFF"
| Home team
| Score
| Away team
| Score
| Venue
| Crowd
| Date
|- bgcolor="#FFFFFF"
| 
| 12.9 (81)
| 
| 11.7 (73)
| MCG
| 58,481
| 7 September
|- bgcolor="#FFFFFF"
| Collingwood
| 8.13 (61)
| 
| 18.15 (123)
| MCG
| 51,069
| 14 September

Preliminary Final

|- bgcolor="#CCCCFF"
| Home team
| Score
| Away team
| Score
| Venue
| Crowd
| Date
|- bgcolor="#FFFFFF"
| 
| 15.7 (97)
| 
| 14.7 (91)
| MCG
| 60,653
| 21 September

Bracket

Grand final

Collingwood defeated Richmond 11.13 (79) to 7.8 (50), in front of a crowd of 63,336 people at the MCG 28 September.

Notes
 The leading goalkicker was Gordon Coventry of Collingwood

Awards
 The 1929 VFL Premiership team was Collingwood.
 The VFL's leading goalkicker was Gordon Coventry of Collingwood with 124 goals.
 The winner of the 1929 Brownlow Medal was Albert "Leeter" Collier of Collingwood with 6 votes.
 North Melbourne took the "wooden spoon" in 1929.
Richmond 12.8 (80) defeated  7.15 (57) in the challenge Grand Final, played as a stand-alone game on Thursday 26 September (Show Day holiday) at the Melbourne Cricket Ground before a crowd of 6,544.

Notable events
  set many records during the 1929 season, including:
First team to remain undefeated through an entire home-and away season (never matched, although  came close – with just one loss – in 2000). However, given that they lost the second semi-final to Richmond, they were not undefeated for the entire season.
In three seasons, 1927, 1928, and 1929, the team had played 61 matches, for 53 wins, 1 draw, and 7 losses.
First team to score more than 2,000 points in a single season.
First team to have a full-forward scoring more than 100 goals in a single season.
First team to have a player kick 16 goals in a single match.
First team to be VFL premiers on eight occasions.
 On 18 June 1929 the VFL was incorporated as a public company, and it purchased a three-storey building (later named Harrison House after Henry Harrison who died later that year, on 2 September) on the corner of Spring Street and Flinders Lane.
Clarrie Hearn of Essendon won the 1929 130-yard Stawell Gift in eleven and fifteen sixteenths of a second (approx. 11.94 seconds), off a handicap of 10 yards.
Footscray's 23 effective scoring shots (7 goals and 16 behinds) against Hawthorn in the third quarter of their Round 6 match remains the most scoring shots by a team in one quarter.
Footscray's 16 behinds in that quarter has been equalled only by Collingwood against North Melbourne in the third quarter in  Round 6, 1970.

References  

 Maplestone, M., Flying Higher: History of the Essendon Football Club 1872–1996, Essendon Football Club, (Melbourne), 1996. 
 Rogers, S. & Brown, A., Every Game Ever Played: VFL/AFL Results 1897–1997 (Sixth Edition), Viking Books, (Ringwood), 1998. 
 Ross, J. (ed), 100 Years of Australian Football 1897–1996: The Complete Story of the AFL, All the Big Stories, All the Great Pictures, All the Champions, Every AFL Season Reported, Viking, (Ringwood), 1996.

External links
 1929 Season - AFL Tables

Australian Football League seasons
VFL